Puelma is a surname. Notable people with the surname include:

Alfredo Valenzuela Puelma (1856–1909), Chilean painter
Carmen Puelma (1933–2009), Chilean journalist
Dora Puelma (1898-1972), Chilean artist